Richard Lloyd Ruby (January 12, 1928 – March 23, 2009) was an American racecar driver who raced in the USAC Championship Car series for 20 years, achieving 7 victories and 88 top-ten finishes. He also had success in endurance racing, winning the 24 Hours of Daytona (twice), the 1966 12 Hours of Sebring and the 1966 World Sportscar Championship.

Racing career
Ruby raced in the USAC Championship Car series in the 1958–1977 seasons, with 177 career starts, including the Indianapolis 500 from 1960 to 1977. He achieved 88 top-ten finishes, and seven victories. His best finish at Indy was third, in 1964. In 1966, he led the Indy 500 for 68 laps.

Ruby also had two endurance racing victories in the 24 Hours of Daytona (1965–1966), both times partnering with Ken Miles. Ruby and Miles teamed up to win the 1966 12 Hours of Sebring and the 1966 World Sportscar Championship. Ruby was scheduled to drive in the 1966 24 Hours of Le Mans, however he was forced to withdraw due to spinal injuries suffered in a plane crash. A year later, he teamed with Denny Hulme in a Ford GT 40 Mk IV for the 1967 24 Hours of Le Mans. Ruby played a key role in Ford Motor Company's GT40 program in the mid-1960s. He also raced in the 1961 United States Grand Prix.

Indianapolis 500
Despite a Championship Car career replete with success, Ruby is probably best remembered for his many misfortunes at the Indianapolis 500. His biography, written by Ted Buss in 2000, was titled, Lloyd Ruby: The Greatest Driver Never to Win the Indy 500. Ruby led the race in five different years, for a total of 126 laps, however, his best finish at Indianapolis was third, in 1964. His only other top-five finish at Indy came in 1968. In 1991, he was inducted into the Auto Racing Hall of Fame.

Perhaps Ruby's most notorious hard-luck bout at Indy came in 1969. With race leader Mario Andretti experiencing overheating problems, Ruby was in a strong position to score a victory. During a pit stop around the halfway point, a crew member motioned Ruby to pull away too soon. The refueling nozzle was still engaged in the car's left saddle tank, and as Ruby dropped the clutch, the car lurched forward. The nozzle ruptured a hole in the gas tank, ending Ruby's day.

Death
He died in 2009 at the age of 81 in his hometown of Wichita Falls, Texas.

Legacy and halls of fame
Ruby's racing career was honored with the Bruton Smith Legends Award at the Texas Motor Sports Hall of Fame in Fort Worth in 2005. He was inducted into the National Midget Auto Racing Hall of Fame in 2008. Ruby was also named co-recipient of the Louis Meyer Award along with Hélio Castroneves at the induction ceremony and special recognition dinner in Indianapolis. In 2015, he was inducted in the Motorsports Hall of Fame of America

Indianapolis Motor Speedway historian Donald Davidson joined racing greats Johnny Rutherford, Parnelli Jones and Al and Bobby Unser in Wichita Falls when the Lloyd Ruby Overpass was named in honor of their racing friend.

Complete USAC Championship Car results

Indianapolis 500 results

 Ruby owns three of the top-ten 5-race finishing streaks in the 1960s

World Championship career summary
The Indianapolis 500 was part of the FIA World Championship from 1950 through 1960. Drivers competing at Indy during those years were credited with World Championship points and participation. Ruby participated in two World Championship races: the 1960 Indianapolis 500 and the 1961 United States Grand Prix. He scored no championship points.

Complete Formula One World Championship results
(key)

References

American Formula One drivers
1928 births
Indianapolis 500 drivers
2009 deaths
24 Hours of Le Mans drivers
24 Hours of Daytona drivers
People from Wichita Falls, Texas
Racing drivers from Texas
World Sportscar Championship drivers
12 Hours of Sebring drivers